Pangutaran, officially the Municipality of Pangutaran (Tausūg: Kawman sin Pangutaran; Bahasa Pangutaran Siyama: Lahat Pangutaran), is a 4th class municipality in the province of Sulu, Philippines. According to the 2020 census, it has a population of 36,374 people.

Geography

Barangays
Pangutaran is politically subdivided into 16 barangays.

Climate

Demographics

Economy

Etymology
The name PANGUTARAN is originally after the "Shariff Pangutaran" name, the first Filipino people who discover and inhabited the island together with the family members (Belong to Salip Descendants). But before what we know today as PANGUTARAN it is also called "Pulau Bangkuruan" by Malay speakers means The island with the Bangkudo tree(s) (Morinda citrifolia). The word phrase "Siyama" stands un impossible originated from the Hindi language meaning "Forbearance" or "kshama:क्षमा" because sheikh Karim Al-Makhdum arrived (in Bohe' Indangan, Simunul, Tawi-Tawi, Philippines in 1380 and propagated Islam) in the Philippines contemporary with Hindi traders from India.

References

External links
 Pangutaran Profile at PhilAtlas.com
 [ Philippine Standard Geographic Code]
 Pangutaran Profile at the DTI Cities and Municipalities Competitive Index
 Philippine Census Information
 Local Governance Performance Management System

Municipalities of Sulu
Island municipalities in the Philippines